The Battle of Suakin (also known as the Battle of Gemaizah), part of the Mahdist War, occurred on 20 December 1888 when General Francis Grenfell defeated a Mahdist, or Dervish, force near Suakin, a chief port of Sudan.

The Mahdist force, under Osman Digna, had advanced on Suakin with an intention to invest it. From Suakin, General Grenfell launched a sortie against the Mahdists, who were attempting to capture the Water Forts. After one and a half hours of fighting, the casualties were 12 on the Anglo- Egyptian side and 1,000 on the side of the Mahdists. After this, the Mahdists withdrew, removing any threat to Suakin.

General Kitchener was present, commanding an Egyptian Army brigade comprising Sudanese troops, this being the first battle where units of the Egyptian Army played a significant part since its reform by the British. They performed well in battle, enhancing the reputation of both the reformed Egyptian Army and of General Kitchener.

In the battle, three of the swords of the 20th Hussars broke short, an incident which later caused debate in the House of Commons of the United Kingdom.

Egyptian and British forces present received both the Egypt Medal with clasp 'Gemaizah 1888' and the Bronze Khedive's Star.

Forces 
The British forces involved in the battle were:

 Royal Navy
 20th Hussars
 2nd Battalion, King's Own Scottish Borderers
 1st Battalion, Welch Regiment
 1st Battalion, Royal Ulster Rifles

References

1888 in Sudan
Battles of the Mahdist War
Conflicts in 1888
December 1888 events